Slovenska Vas is a settlement on the Rinža River west of Stara Cerkev in the Municipality of Kočevje in southern Slovenia. The area is part of the traditional region of Lower Carniola and is now included in the Southeast Slovenia Statistical Region.

References

External links
Slovenska Vas on Geopedia
Pre–World War II map of Slovenska Vas with oeconyms and family names

Populated places in the Municipality of Kočevje